Sertan Taşqın, born on 8 October 1997) is an Azerbaijani professional footballer who plays as a defender for Zira in the Azerbaijan Premier League.

Club career
Taşqın made his debut in the Azerbaijan Premier League for Keşla on 28 May 2015 against Sumgayit.

On 18 July 2020, Taşqın signed a two-year contract with Zira FK.

International career
He represented Azerbaijani youth teams. He represented the senior Azerbaijan national team in a friendly 1–1 draw with Qatar on 27 March 2021.

Honours
Keşla
Azerbaijan Cup (1): 2017–18

References

External links
 

1997 births
Living people
Association football defenders
Azerbaijani footballers
Azerbaijan international footballers
Azerbaijan youth international footballers
Azerbaijan under-21 international footballers
Azerbaijan Premier League players
Shamakhi FK players
Sumgayit FK players
Zira FK players